The 2004 Formula 3 Sudamericana season was the 15th Formula 3 Sudamericana season. It began on 24 April 2004, at  Autódromo Internacional Nelson Piquet in Brasília and ended on 19 December at Autódromo José Carlos Pace in São Paulo. Brazilian driver Alexandre Sarnes Negrão won the title.

Drivers and teams
 All drivers competed in Pirelli-shod. All teams were Brazilian registered

References

External links
 Official website

Formula 3 Sudamericana
Sudamericana
Formula 3 Sudamericana seasons
Sudamericana F3